John Joseph McGuinness (1945 – 30 August 2021), known as Seán McGuinness, was a hurling manager. A member of the Patrick Sarsfields club, he had a lengthy career as a manager at club and inter-county levels.

Managerial career

McGuinness first became involved in team management as a selector with the Patrick Sarsfields that won the 1974 Antrim County Championship. He subsequently took over as manager at the club, and guided the team to a league title in 1976.

At inter-county level, McGuinness was first nominated as a selector with the Antrim senior hurling team in 1983, and ended up taking over as manager. His fours seasons in charge saw Antrim beaten in four consecutive All-Ireland semi-finals, however, his team came close to causing an upset against Cork in 1986. After resigning on a point of principle, McGuinness was back in inter-county management with the Down senior hurling team. His six seasons in charge saw Down win two Ulster Championship titles and gain promotion to Division 1 of the National Hurling League. McGuinness simultaneously took charge of the Ulster team that contested three Railway Cup finals in four years. He returned to the Antrim senior team for one season in 1998, ending the year with the Ulster Championship title.

Personal life and death

Born in West Belfast, McGuinness was educated at Hardinge Street Junior Technical School, before leaving school at 15. He trained as a sheet metalworker and later worked at St Patrick's Training School as an engineering instructor.

McGuinness died after a brief illness on 30 August 2021, aged 76.

Honours

Patrick Sarsfields
Antrim Senior Hurling Championship: 1974

Antrim
Ulster Senior Hurling Championship: 1998

Down
Ulster Senior Hurling Championship: 1992, 1995

References

1945 births
2021 deaths
Hurling managers
Sportspeople from Belfast